Robert Adam Ross Maclennan, Baron Maclennan of Rogart,  (26 June 1936 – 18 January 2020) was a British Liberal Democrat politician and life peer.

He was the last leader of the Social Democratic Party (SDP), serving during the negotiations that led to its merger with the Liberal Party in 1988. He then became joint interim leader of the new party, known as the Social and Liberal Democrats (SLD) and later as the Liberal Democrats. He served as a Member of Parliament (MP) from 1966 to 2001, when he was elevated to the House of Lords.

Early life
MacLennan's father,  Sir Hector MacLennan, was a renowned gynaecologist and obstetrician. His mother, Isabel Margaret (née Adam), was a physician and public health activist. He was the brother of actor and director David MacLennan, actress and writer Elizabeth MacLennan, and Kenneth MacLennan.

He was educated at Glasgow Academy; Balliol College, Oxford; Trinity College, Cambridge; and Columbia University, New York City. He was called to the bar in 1962 at Gray's Inn and before entering parliament practised as an international lawyer based in London.

In Parliament

He became Member of Parliament (MP) for the constituency of Caithness and Sutherland in 1966, and serving until 1997; and for Caithness, Sutherland and Easter Ross after boundary changes, from 1997 to 2001.

He was first elected as a member of the Labour Party and served as a junior minister in the Labour government of 1974–1979, but in 1981 defected to become a founder member of the SDP. He was one of the few SDP MPs to keep their seats in the 1983 general election. After his stint as SDP Leader in 1988, he served as a front bench spokesman for the Liberal Democrats, and as their president from 1994 until 1998.

He was appointed to the Privy Council in 1997.

After his retirement at the 2001 general election, he was raised to the House of Lords, created a life peer as Baron Maclennan of Rogart, of Rogart in Sutherland. He was the party's Cabinet Office and Scotland spokesman in the House of Lords until 2015.

Personal life and death 
Maclennan married Helen Noyes (née Cutter), an American teacher, in 1968, and they had two children, a son and a daughter in addition to a son from her previous marriage.

Maclennan died on 16 January 2020, at age 83.

References

External links 
 
 Lord Maclennan of Rogart profile at the site of Liberal Democrats

|-

|-

|-

|-

1936 births
2020 deaths
Alumni of Balliol College, Oxford
Alumni of Trinity College, Cambridge
Leaders of the Liberal Democrats (UK)
Liberal Democrats (UK) life peers
Members of the Fabian Society
Members of the Parliament of the United Kingdom for Highland constituencies
Members of the Privy Council of the United Kingdom
People educated at the Glasgow Academy
Politicians from Glasgow
Presidents of the Liberal Democrats (UK)
Scottish Labour MPs
Scottish Liberal Democrat MPs
Social Democratic Party (UK) MPs for Scottish constituencies
UK MPs 1966–1970
UK MPs 1970–1974
UK MPs 1974
UK MPs 1974–1979
UK MPs 1979–1983
UK MPs 1983–1987
UK MPs 1987–1992
UK MPs 1992–1997
UK MPs 1997–2001
Life peers created by Elizabeth II